KDKD-FM (95.3 FM) is a radio station broadcasting a country music format. It is licensed to Clinton, Missouri, United States. The station is owned by Clayton and Brittany Radford, through licensee Radford Media Group LLC, and features national news programming from Fox News Radio.

KDKD-FM's morning show, Mornings in the Stix, is hosted by Steve Stevens. KDKD-FM broadcasts an array of sports including Clinton High School football, basketball and baseball.

References

External links

DKD-FM
Country radio stations in the United States
Radio stations established in 1975
1975 establishments in Missouri